Cheyenne (IPA: /ʃaɪˈæn/) is a unisex name of Lakota origin, though it is more commonly used by females than males. The origin of the word is uncertain, though it may be derived from the Lakota language, from the word Šahíyena. Alternative spellings include Cheyanne and Shyanne and diminutives include Chey (IPA: /ʃaɪ/). The name has enjoyed some degree of popularity in recent years in the United States, with it being in the top 450 names for girls between 2000 and 2017, according to the Social Security Administration.

Bearers of the name include:

Cheyenne Brando (1970–1995), Tahitian fashion model and daughter of Marlon Brando
Cheyenne Campbell (born 1986), New Zealander rugby union player
Chey Dunkley (born 1992), English footballer
Cheyanne Evans-Gray (born 1998), British sprinter
Cheyenne Haynes (born 1995), American actress, performer, and child model
Cheyenne Jackson (born 1975), American actor and singer
Cheyenne Kimball (born 1990), American singer-songwriter
Cheyenne Marie Mize, American folk singer-songwriter
Cheyenne Parker (basketball) (born 1992), American WNBA basketball player
Cheyenne Woods (born 1990), American golfer

English unisex given names
Unisex given names
Masculine given names
Feminine given names